Anglo-America most often refers to a region in the Americas in which English is the main language and British culture and the British Empire have had significant historical, ethnic, linguistic, and cultural impact. Anglo-America is distinct from Latin America, a region of the Americas where Romance languages (e.g., Spanish, Portuguese and French) are prevalent. The adjective "Anglo-American", however, often refers to a broader geographic and cultural framework always encompassing the United Kingdom, and often including countries such as Australia and New Zealand. The adjective is commonly used, for instance, in the phrase "Anglo-American law", a concept roughly coterminous with Common Law.

Geographic region 

The term Anglo-America frequently refers specifically to the United States and Canada, by far the two most populous English-speaking countries in North America. Other areas composing the Anglophone Caribbean include territories of the former British West Indies, Belize, Bermuda, and Guyana.

Two notable territories with substantial non-Anglophone majorities are nonetheless often included in Anglo-America for non-linguistic reasons. In Canada, the francophone province of Quebec, Acadia in New Brunswick and a part of Cochrane District are sometimes considered part of Anglo-America for cultural, economic, geographical, historical, and political reasons. Similarly, Spanish-speaking Puerto Rico is considered part of Anglo-America because of its status as a unincorporated territory of the United States. Conversely, Sint Eustatius, Sint Maarten, and Saba are not typically included in Anglo-America, despite their English-speaking majorities, because they are constituent countries or public bodies that form part of the Kingdom of the Netherlands.

Ethnic groups

Economy 

People from other parts of the world have immigrated to Anglo-America in search of a better quality of life, better employment, and an escape from famine, poverty, violence, and conflict. People from many different ethnic origins in Latin America and more remote places all over the world, including the less English-dominant parts of Oceania, continental Europe, Asia, and Africa, all live in Anglo-America contemporarily.

See also

General
 Anglo
 English Americans
 Americas (terminology)
 Americas
 North American English
 North America
 Northern America
 Central America
 South American English
 South America
 Caribbean English
 Caribbean
 Anglophone Caribbean
 British America
 British diaspora in Africa
 British North America
 White Anglo-Saxon Protestant
Anglosphere
 Anglosphere
 English-speaking world
Languages
 French America
 Spanish America
 Hispanic America
 Ibero-America
 Latin America
 Portuguese America

Lists
 List of North American countries by GDP (nominal)
 List of North American countries by GDP per capita
 List of North American countries by GDP (PPP)
 List of South American countries by GDP (nominal)
 List of South American countries by GDP per capita
 List of South American countries by GDP (PPP)

References 

Americas
America
Canadian culture
American culture
Regions of the Americas
Cultural regions
Anglosphere